Wilf Woodcock (15 February 1892 – October 1966) was an English footballer. His regular position was as a forward. Born in Droylsden, he played for Abbey Hey, Stalybridge Celtic, Manchester United, Manchester City, Stockport County and Wigan Borough.

References

External links
MUFCInfo.com profile

1892 births
Footballers from Ashton-under-Lyne
1966 deaths
English footballers
Abbey Hey F.C. players
Stalybridge Celtic F.C. players
Manchester United F.C. players
Manchester City F.C. players
Stockport County F.C. players
Wigan Borough F.C. players
Sandbach Ramblers F.C. players
Association football forwards